The Freight and Salvage (known as "The Freight") is a nonprofit musical performance venue in Berkeley, California that primarily hosts Americana music and world music acts.

History
The Freight was founded in 1968 and derived its name from the used furniture store that previously occupied the same space on San Pablo Avenue. In its early years, the Freight was a magnet for bluegrass fans and musicians but also presented an eclectic mix of folk, acoustic, Scottish and Irish, jugbands, mimes, spoken word and open mics.

In 1983, it formally incorporated as the Berkeley Society for the Preservation of Traditional Music. The club moved to a 220-seat space on Addison Street in 1988. On August 27, 2009, The Freight opened a 490-seat venue in Berkeley's Downtown Arts District. The $12 million project, built to LEED standards, has a green roof and features reclaimed wood from the original building on the site throughout, as well as classrooms to fulfill the organization's educational mission. The building was designed by Berkeley-based architects Marcy Wong and Donn Logan and the sound system was provided by Meyer Sound Laboratories.

Musicians
Regular performers in its earlier years, such as Eric Thompson, Suzy Thompson, Laurie Lewis, Peter Rowan, Jody Stecher, and Linda Tillery continue to perform there. Other notable performers from its first decade include Elizabeth Cotten, Lightnin' Hopkins, Malvina Reynolds, Alice Stuart, Hazel and Alice, Kate Wolf, and frequent shows by Vern and Ray.

Notable musicians who have performed at the Freight in more recent years include Dave Alvin, Greg Brown, Dan Bern, Theodore Bikel, David Bromberg, Johnny Clegg, Judy Collins, Ry Cooder, Sue Draheim, Tommy Emmanuel, David Grisman, Dan Hicks, Tom Paxton, Utah Phillips, Ricky Skaggs, Rosalie Sorrels, Marty Stuart, Richard Thompson, Cheryl Wheeler, Dar Williams, Cris Williamson and Odetta, among many others. Several artists have released live recordings of Freight performances, including Nickel Creek, Hot Buttered Rum, Graham Parker, John Wesley Harding, Suzy Thompson, Kelly Joe Phelps, Fishtank Ensemble,  Marley's Ghost, and the Berkeley-based band Rebecca Riots.

Its open mic is the longest-running open stage in the San Francisco Bay Area and has featured Shawn Colvin, Dana Carvey, and Alvin Youngblood Hart.

References

External links
 Freight and Salvage web site
 Photos: Freight & Salvage Grand Opening, Berkeley, CA - Aug. 27-30, 2009
 Freight and Salvage - A 1960s History

Culture of Berkeley, California
Music venues in the San Francisco Bay Area
Buildings and structures in Berkeley, California
Music organizations based in the United States
Tourist attractions in Berkeley, California